The Committee for the Executive Office was established to advise and assist the First Minister and deputy First Minister, on matters within their responsibilities as Ministers. The committee undertakes a scrutiny, policy development and consultation role with respect to the Executive Office and plays a key role in the consideration and development of legislation.

The Assembly approved a motion on 12 June 2007 to change the name of the committee from Committee of the Centre to Committee for the Office of the First Minister and deputy First Minister. Following the renaming of departments in the Northern Ireland Executive in 2016, the Assembly committee was renamed as the Committee for the Executive Office, reflecting the new name of the former Office of the First Minister and deputy First Minister.

Membership (9)

See also 
 Executive Office
 First Minister and deputy First Minister

References

External links 
 Committee for the Office of the First Minister and deputy First Minister

Northern Ireland Assembly